The Philadelphia to Harrisburg Main Line is a rail line owned and operated by Amtrak in the U.S. state of Pennsylvania. This is the only electrified Amtrak line in the United States outside of the main line of the Northeast Corridor. The line runs from Philadelphia, where it meets the Northeast Corridor at Zoo interlocking (milepost 1.9), west to Harrisburg (MP 104.6), where electrification ends. It is part of the longer Keystone Corridor, which continues west to Pittsburgh along the Norfolk Southern Railway's Pittsburgh Line. This section is sometimes referred to as "Keystone East" and is part of Amtrak's Keystone Service.

Philadelphia's Suburban Station was the original start of the line – as well as the headquarters for the Pennsylvania Railroad – and is milepost zero for the line.

History

The line runs along the route of the former Pennsylvania Main Line and passes through the Philadelphia Main Line, the suburban region named for it. The Pennsylvania Railroad had originally electrified this line in the 1930s, but it fell into disuse in the 1980s under Amtrak.

Amtrak and the Pennsylvania Department of Transportation restored electrical service in October, 2006. This allows speeds up to 110 miles per hour.

The line received about $26 million from the 2009 Federal American Reinvestment and Recovery Act that was used to eliminate the last three grade crossings, which will advance the goal of 125-mph operations, reduce overall trip times, and improve service reliability. The grade crossings were located in Lancaster County and the last was closed in 2014.

In the 2000s, there was discussion of commuter rail from Lancaster to Harrisburg (the Capital Red Rose Corridor), but the proposal has subsequently been abandoned.

Current rail services

Amtrak's Keystone Service and Pennsylvanian operate over the entire line. SEPTA Regional Rail Paoli/Thorndale Line trains operate east of Thorndale, with the rights to continue revenue service west to Parkesburg and to run west to Cork Interlocking (just east of Amtrak's Lancaster station) to reverse direction.

Freight trackage rights over the whole line are assigned to the Norfolk Southern Railway. The Canadian Pacific Railway also has rights over a small piece near Harrisburg, from the west end to Roy Interlocking in Royalton, to allow CP trains to get from the end of their Sunbury Line or Allentown to Perryville, Maryland.

The Commonwealth of Pennsylvania provides the subsidies for Amtrak for the Keystone Service and Pennsylvanian passenger routes that operate on this line.

Stations

All stations are located in Pennsylvania.

References

 "The Electrification of the Pennsylvania Railroad from Broad Street Terminal Philadelphia to Paoli." The Electric Journal. Vol. 12, No. 12 (December 1915). (Pittsburgh, PA: The Electric Journal.) pp. 536–541.

 
Pennsylvania Railroad lines
Electric railways in Pennsylvania
Passenger rail transportation in Pennsylvania
Rail infrastructure in Pennsylvania
Railway lines in the United States